Claudia Cristina Moreno González (born November 8, 1977) is a Venezuelan beauty pageant titleholder who was the official representative of Venezuela to the Miss Universe 2000 pageant.

Pageant participation

Miss Venezuela 1999
Moreno competed in Miss Venezuela 1999, representing Distrito Capital, where she finished in the Top 10.

Miss Republica Bolivariana Venezuela 2000
When the winner of Miss Venezuela 1999, Martina Thorogood, was denied for Miss Universe 2000, the Miss Venezuela Organization decided to have a second, smaller pageant to send a delegate to Miss Universe, consisting of delegates who had competed in previous Miss Venezuela competitions, called Miss Republica Bolivariana Venezuela 2000. Moreno competed and was chosen to represent Venezuela at Miss Universe.

Miss Universe 2000
Moreno competed in the 49th annual Miss Universe competition, held in Nicosia, Cyprus on May 12, 2000, where she finished as 1st Runner Up to Lara Dutta of India.

References

External links

Miss Venezuela Official Website
Miss Universe Official Website

1977 births
Living people
Miss Universe 2000 contestants
People from Caracas
Venezuelan beauty pageant winners
Venezuelan telenovela actresses